The International Speed Windsurfing Class (ISWC) is a class of speed windsurfing boards that has developed over the last 30 years in order to facilitate high performance competition in strong winds and on flat water. The International Speed Windsurfing Class is controlled by World Sailing and has been adopted as an international class in spring 2007. The class is defined as an "experimental" class, which means that the class rules give a wide possibility for the development of new equipment, also outside commonly used technologies. Speed windsurfing events are normally held on "flat water" as opposed to coastal surf; which means side-offshore wind directions with a strength of at least . The ISWC speed world champion is established throughout a tour, the Speed World Cup.

Records

This exceeded his previous record of  set on 13 November 2004 at the same venue.
 Updated List of Speed Sailing Records, Speed All Time Ranking
 Boards Magazine Speed-Sailing History
 Complete Chronology of Speed Sailing Records

Record Spots and Event Sites
Speed Windsurfing events are normally held at venues with reliable, strong offshore winds and flat water. In opposite to the venues for record attempts, accessibility is important as well as a not to difficult course to allow for proper race organization. For world record attempts, venues are chosen only by the best wind and water characteristics.
Sotavento Beach, Fuerteventura, Spain
Walvis Bay, Namibia
Luderitz, Namibia

Prominent Competitors
Björn Dunkerbeck, 2005 World Champion

Finian Maynard, 2006 World Champion

External links
International Speed Windsurfing Class website
ISAF website
International Windsurfing Association

Speed Windsurfing
Windsurfing
Windsurfing equipment